Jacinta Sandiford Amador (9 April 1932 – 1 January 1987) was an Ecuadorian female track and field athlete who competed in the high jump.

Born in the Eloy Alfaro area of Durán, Ecuador, she was the daughter of an Englishman who worked as an engineer for Ecuador's state railway. This made her Ecuador's first ever medallist at the competition. She remained the only South American woman to have won that title until Solange Witteveen of Argentina did so in 1999.

Upon the Ecuadorian delegation's return, Sandiford was the first athlete off the plane which led to images of her receiving national attention. Her career came to a close shortly afterwards, however, as a result of a leg injury and acute apendicitus.

References

External links
El Universo article with image of Sandiford 

1932 births
1987 deaths
Ecuadorian female high jumpers
Pan American Games gold medalists for Ecuador
Pan American Games medalists in athletics (track and field)
Athletes (track and field) at the 1951 Pan American Games
Ecuadorian people of British descent
Medalists at the 1951 Pan American Games